Muriel Thompson (10 June 1875 – 3 March 1939) was a decorated Scottish World War I ambulance driver, racing driver and suffragist.

Early life and family
Thompson was born on 10 June 1875 in Aberdeen, Scotland to Agnes Marion Williamson (1846–1926), the second wife of Cornelius Thompson, a shipowner and marine architect. She was the fifth of eight children. Her grandfather George Thompson had been Lord Provost of Aberdeen and an MP (1852) for the city.

Racing driver and chauffeur for the WSPU 
Thompson was an avid motorist, and from an early age she drove the family car. She and her brothers helped found the Brooklands Automobile Racing Club. On 4 July 1908 she won the first ladies’ motor race held at Brooklands, the Ladies' Bracelet Handicap. She also won the Scratch Motor Car Race.

Thompson was hired as a chauffeur for the Women's Social and Political Union, and drove Emmeline Pankhurst on her national tour in 1909.

War service
During World War I Thompson was a driver for the First Aid Nursing Yeomanry (FANY), joining in January 1915. The role included a requirement to perform mechanical maintenance tasks on the vehicles. In 1916 she was second in command to Lilian Franklin on the first expedition in support of the British Army (the FANY had previously assisted the Belgians and the French).

Awards
On 29 March 1915 she was awarded the Knight's Cross of the Order of Leopold II, by King Albert for evacuating wounded Belgian soldiers under fire near Diksmuide. Thompson was also awarded the Military Medal and the Croix de Guerre for courage under fire while moving injured during bombing raid in May 1918.

== Later life ==
After the war Thompson lived in Kensington in London. She died at her home on 3 March 1939 of encephalitis lethargica. She was buried in Brompton cemetery, London.

See also
 First Aid Nursing Yeomanry

References

External links
 ODNB entry for Thompson
 London Gazette citation for the Military Medal.

1875 births
1939 deaths
Scottish racing drivers
Scottish female racing drivers
Scottish suffragists
Recipients of the Military Medal
British women in World War I
People from Aberdeen
Recipients of the Croix de guerre (Belgium)
Recipients of the Order of Leopold II
Female recipients of the Croix de Guerre (France)
First Aid Nursing Yeomanry people